Charles Sturt (1795–1869) was an English explorer of Australia.

Charles Sturt may also refer to:

People
Charles Napier Sturt (1832–1886), MP for Dorchester
Charles Sturt (1763–1812), MP for Bridport

Other uses
City of Charles Sturt, a local government area in the western suburbs of Adelaide, South Australia
Charles Sturt University, a university in Australia

See also

Charles Stuart (disambiguation)
Charles Sturt Adelaide International